Karl Madis (born 1959 in Tallinn) is an Estonian singer.

In 1984 he graduated from Georg Ots Tallinn Music School in saxophone speciality.

He has been a singer for several bands, including Mahavok and Karavan.

References

Living people
1959 births
20th-century Estonian male singers
Estonian pop singers
21st-century Estonian male singers
Singers from Tallinn
Tallinn Georg Ots Music School alumni